Giethmen is a hamlet in the Dutch province of Overijssel. It is a part of the municipality of Ommen, and lies about 21 km east of Zwolle.

It was first mentioned between 1381 as 1383 Gheetmen. The etymology is unclear. In 1840, it was home to 149 people.

Giethemer Kerkpad
Giethmen is known for its kerkpad, or church path, an old trail which leads from Giethmen to Ommen. Because Giethmen does not have its own church, its inhabitants used to walk (and later bicycle) up and down to Ommen twice every Sunday. The trail's pedestrian bridge across the Regge, known as the Giethemerkerkbrug, has become an icon for Giethmen. Today the Giethemer Kerkpad is part of a popular hiking and bicycle trail.

References

Populated places in Overijssel
Ommen